Bandar Meru Raya (Jawi: بندر مرو راي) is a new township in Ipoh, Perak, Malaysia. It is located between Jelapang and Chemor.

The township includes various new shops, a shopping mall, a bus and taxi terminal, and the Tenby International School. Located across the North-South Highway from Jelapang, Meru Raya is set to also house over 10 government buildings, including those for the Ministry of Home Affairs, Perak Foundation, Forestry Department, National Audit Department, Malaysia Anti-Corruption Agency, Ministry of Home Affairs and the National Archives of Malaysia.

References
Bandar Meru Raya Website
Bandar Meru Raya Community
Bandar Meru Raya News

Populated places in Perak
Ipoh